The Walsh Island Dockyard and Engineering Works was a dockyard and engineering workshop established by the Government of New South Wales in 1913, at Walsh Island, Newcastle, Australia. The foundation stone was laid on 15 June 1913 by Arthur Griffith, the Minister for Works. The dockyard was constructed as a replacement for Sydney's Cockatoo Island Dockyard, that was taken over by the Federal Government in 1913.

Forty-seven vessels were constructed at the dockyard, including a 15,000-ton floating dock. The engineering works fabricated bolts, castings and steel fabrication work. It assembled electric carriages for the New South Wales Government Railways as well as trams. The dockyard was eventually abandoned in 1933 after the great depression and was dismantled and relocated to the new State Dockyard at Dyke End, Carrington.

Ships built at Walsh Island Dockyard
SS Mildred (1914)
SS Delungra (1919)
SS Enoggera (1920)
SS Eurelia (1920)
SS Eromanga (1921)
SS Kooroongaba (1921)
SS Kuttabul (1922)
SS Koompartoo (1922)
Sir Arthur Dorman (1925)
SS Dorlonco (1925)
SS Birubi (1927)
hopper dredge Hermes'' (1930)
15,000 ton floating dock

Products of engineering works
NSW Department of Railways Rail Standard Type Rail Cars C3171-C3220 (1926-1927)
NSW Department of Railways Rail Standard Type Rail Trailers T4301-T4548 (1926-1929)
NSW Department of Railways Rail Standard Type Rail Cars C3251-C3300 (1928)
NSW Department of Railways Rail Parcel Vans C3901-C3903 (1928)
Sydney P-Class Tram

References

Engineering companies of Australia
History of Newcastle, New South Wales
Defunct government entities of New South Wales
Defunct rolling stock manufacturers of Australia
Shipbuilding companies of Australia
1913 establishments in Australia
1933 disestablishments in Australia
Economy of Newcastle, New South Wales
Shipyards of New South Wales